BrightRoll was a programmatic video advertising platform that was acquired by Yahoo!. BrightRoll's video platform became Yahoo's primary video advertising marketplace and demand-side platform. The BrightRoll brand was discontinued by Verizon Media the parent company of Yahoo in favor of Verizon Media Video SSP (re-brand of AOL's One Video Platform) after the company merged. Yahoo and AOL and consolidated the Ad platforms during 20172018 to phase out duplicate platforms.

BrightRoll was founded in June 2006 by Tod Sacerdoti, the company's CEO, and Dru Nelson. Its headquarters were in San Francisco, California, with offices across the United States, Canada, and Europe.

In November 2014, Yahoo! announced that it would acquire BrightRoll for $640 million.

Funding 
BrightRoll raised $36 million in capital, with the last round of funding closing in November 2011. Principal investors include Dave Welsh, Adams Street Partners, Rob Theis, Scale Venture Partners, Evangelos Simoudis, Trident Capital and Jon Callaghn, TRUE Ventures.

Products 

The BrightRoll platform delivers, manages and measures the performance of digital video advertising campaigns across web, mobile, and connected TV. According to comScore, BrightRoll reached the most unique viewers in the United States in 2013.

The BrightRoll platform includes a real-time bidding marketplace and powers programmatic video for hundreds of buyers, including brands, agencies, agency trading desks (ATDs), demand-side platforms (DSPs), and advertising networks and enables them to connect with digital audiences to support advertising campaign objectives. Customers access the platform through the company's advanced programmatic buying console (self- or managed- service) or connect server-to-server for real-time bidding. The platform gives publishers and software developers access to a video marketplace.

References 

Companies based in San Francisco
Privately held companies based in California